Braulio Maldonado Sández (1903 – 1990) was a Mexican politician who served as the first Governor of Baja California from 1953 until 1959. Braulio Maldonado Sandez was one of the most colorful leaders in the history of twentieth century Mexican politics.

Early life
Born in San José del Cabo, Baja California Territory, Mexico in 1903 to Cruz Maldonado Zumaya and Luisa Sández Ojeda.

References

1903 births
1990 deaths
Governors of Baja California
Presidents of the Chamber of Deputies (Mexico)
20th-century Mexican politicians
National Autonomous University of Mexico alumni
20th-century Mexican lawyers
Politicians from Baja California Sur
People from San José del Cabo